Francis Masse, known as Masse (born 21 August 1948 in Gap, Hautes-Alpes), is a French artist. In the early 1970s, he first became acquainted with his sculptures, then turned to animation and cartoon.

The poetic universe of Masse is served by an unusual graphic design where the scenes are created by means of printing rasters, as well as by a subtle work on the relief, the frame and the perspectives.

Mainly since Les Deux du Balcon (1985), Masse starts focusing primarily on the scientific subjects: physics, astrophysics, cosmology, chaos, quantum mechanics, and so on, and extrapolates them with fantasy in a nonsensical, poetic and jubilant universe.

Masse's universe, both erudite and off-the-wall, is praised and appreciated by his peers and scientists. The anonymous and absurd characters he staged, with their big noses, hats and coats, obsolete in everything evolve in a parallel world where codes are surprising. Frémion affirms that a strong work speaks only posteriorly and that the work of Masse will characterize our time as surely as Callot, Caravaggio or Daumier.

In the late 1980s, Masse abandoned comics and devoted himself to sculpture. Since 2007, Masse exhibits his works, reissues his comic strips and albums and publishes original works.

Biography 
After high school, Francis Masse studied at the art school of Nancy and then Grenoble, he makes himself known first of all with his sculptures, it is an unknown aspect of his work, which nevertheless became his main activity again since the early 1990s. From the early 1970s, he made his first comics, including the "beckettian" Le Roi de le monde published in Le Canard Sauvage in 1973.

Very early, he produced animations whose graphic design described by Romain Brethes as audacious, inimitable and unclassifiable and prefigures the peculiar style of his comics. Yves Frémion points out that his universe was in place since the beginning, but graphically progressed very quickly. Masse uses hatching, wefts, satin coated. The drawing is dark, the detailed wefts close to engraving.

Masse presents a graphic universe that embodies the post-1968 trend in the avant-garde press of the early 1970s. According to Romain Brethes, Masse is part of the history of comics for having embraced its most radical revolutions and having participated in his most fruitful experiments.

Masse's universe is often described as surrealistic. However, Romain Brethes points out that we should rather speak of hyperrealism, because, when reading these comics, dating back to the early 1980s, we are witnessing, incredulously, the prophetic advent of the world of decades to come: ecological catastrophes, the world of multimedia and the virtual world are omnipresent with television, video games and new technologies that announce the computerized society.

Cartoons 
Between 1970 and 72, he tackles animation in the association aaa (Atelier d'Animation d'Annecy) with the free jazz delirium of the Judgement Dernier and the hilarious Cagouince Migrateur. In 1973–74 with Pink Splash Production (created by Paul Dopff) known for his rather underground spirit, he directed Évasion Expresse, a short film combining animated papercutting and cartoons on cellulo, integrated with the previous films in the program Dessins Animés et Cie screened for several weeks in 1974 at the Ciné-Halles in Paris. Yves Frémion, who attended, considers that they are breathtaking, simple, effective, virtuous, hilarious, pure masterpieces.

In his report of the 1974 Grenoble festival, a critic of Art Vivant defined the style of Évasion Expresse of "Crumbian" graphics and splendidly black humor. Évasion Expresse tells the story of a man sitting on the window side in a train compartment and who lets himself go to a fantasized vision of an appearance in the scrolling landscape... up to a "apotheosis".

Comic strips 
In parallel with his animations, Masse continues to make comic strips, first of all he participated to the fanzine of Poussin: Gonocoque (1973-1974). Since then, the important magazines at that time solicited him: Actuel, Le Canard Sauvage, L'Écho des Savanes, Charlie Mensuel, Zinc, Hara-Kiri, Métal Hurlant, Surprise and Fluide Glacial.

He published in Charlie #84 "Le Complot chromatique", a quite long black and white story that tells the bursting in of a small bright pink detail. Yves Frémion points out that Schindler's List uses a similar concept.
The Avalanche is a wild-looking character who carries a bicycle handlebar across his nose, like a bone, he will leave traces with Boucq.

In Les Deux du Balcon, an immense tribute to Flaubert, two socially very different characters discourse on the great scientific theories that Masse distorts in order to propose his vision where poetry, fantasy, humor and nonsense mix with scientific rigor. This album is considered one of the most representative of his work, for Frémion it is evident that this album is one of the greatest comic strips ever published and that it represents a final denial for those who believe that literature or cinema are arts superior to small-mickeys.

Culture 
In order to construct his premonitory, dark, wrecked universe, Masse parses his erudite work of allusions, nods and pastiches with which he cheerfully massacre the doxa.

Philippe Ducat points out that Masse's "drame sombre", is his level of culture. The scientific references he uses are unusual in the world of comics and are reserved for an informed readership. Ducat adds that innovative authors such as Winshluss, Trondheim, Killoffer, David B., Blutch or  consider Masse much more.

Ducat finds that there is some William Hogarth in Masse's work, they share the nonsense, the satire of society, the wry and biting humor. Masse draws on heavyweight coated paper and then scrubs out material, while Hogarth engraved on metal and then printed it. The Englishman confined his characters in a box to experiment on them, playing on space-time as in The False Perspective. Masse does the same, but to a higher degree.

Masse's work is often compared to Goya's one, caricature, causticity and satire are staged in nightmarish universes where fantasy reigns. According to Ducat, Masse's "cucurbitish" character recalls the satirical portraits published by André Gill in the satirical press of the Second Empire, his page layouts recall Little Nemo in Slumberland (1905–14) by Winsor McCay, the collages by Max Ernst, and the Imaginary Prisons of Giovanni Piranese (source claimed by Masse), he adds: This is simply a miracle.

Science 
Masse, largely covers the scientific fields, especially since L'Encyclopédie de Masse (1982) and especially in Les Deux du Balcon (1985). Philippe Ducat evokes a logical connection with the "Science Amusante" of Tom Tit (1890), a work in which unnecessary experiments are illustrated with engravings at the limit of surrealism which inspired René Magritte, and according to Ducat, confines to the absurd, and compares him to Jean-Pierre Brisset and Gaston de Pawlowski with a humor close to Marcel Duchamp's one.

Jean-Marc Lévy-Leblond, physicist and director of the "Science Ouverte" collection at Le Seuil, welcomes Masse's desire to disseminate scientific knowledge in an absolutely new form from a science amateur, in the noblest sense of the term and explains that Masse pulls his inspiration from references and authorities such as Jouvet, Gould, Ruelle or Aspect, and that this guarantee is necessary to support Masse's crazy vision of contemporary science. According to him, Masse demonstrates the underlying scientific truth, since he points out that science progresses by freeing from common sense. He adds that admiring science must not prevent from amusing oneself and that there is room for a merry knowledge. He ends by saying that Masse brings opening thanks to a new scenography which releases from both flat illustration and dubious metaphor.

During his interview with Masse at the festival  in 2015, the physicist Etienne Klein draws a parallel between the work of Masse and the popularization work of the phycician George Gamow who, through his character Mr Tompkins, explains with a whimsical humour the great scientific theories.

The cosmologist  pays tribute to him at the conference "La Cosmologie en Bande Dessinée" (2011), referring to Alfred Jarry, he describes the album (Vue d'artiste) as an innovative "pataphore" and he proposes to symbolically award Masse the title of Doctor of Pataphysics from the University of Paris VI, with his unanimous congratulations.

The mathematician Cédric Villani for the release of his album "Les Rêveurs lunaires" quotes his reference comics authors and named Masse in his personal four aces of great founding authors still alive with Baudoin, Bourgeon, and Tardi. He describes the Masse's universe rather confusing at first, but advises that we are largely rewarded for efforts when diving into and adds that On m'appelle l'Avalanche is certainly a major work of the ninth art.

From reality to nonsense 
In a discussion reported by Gabrielle Lefevre, Masse defined his approach and his humor saying the work of the artist is to give a representation of reality, as the scientist does, and the two approaches complement each other and clarifying: Obviously, I am freer than the scientist! I am only bound to poetry. He points out that, when a scientist makes an effort to popularize, he is obliged to use parables, it sometimes becomes just as in Prévert. According to him, the description of the reality can only pass through humor, because humor is the grammar of what means several things at the same time.

Vincent Baudoux speaks of the apparent "non-sens" (i.e. no sense) of Masse and prefers the Anglo-Saxon term "nonsense" by referring to Robert Benayoun (Les dingues du Nonsense, Baland, 1984), who considers nonsense to be the logic extrapolated up to absurdity, while the French term of "non-sens" translates the absence of logic.

The term "nonsense" is the most suitable for defining the work of Masse, this is why he is more appreciated by a readership open to the Anglo-Saxon culture.

For example, when Terry Gilliam, the American Monty Python, released his film Brazil, he told to Libération that amongst his stated influences figure Goya, the American underground comics and French comics, with a rare admiration for Masse: Fabulous ! I would love to make a film with him, and he still amazes me.

Similarly, in an interview with the magazine Les Inrockuptibles, Art Spiegelman quotes Masse before Crumb and Tardi by saying that what he did was incredible, his work is important and very much underestimated. In this paper, Masse's style is described as strips stripped with the steel wool of a funny cynicism.

Masse and the world of comics 
Although Masse has published in numerous magazines and produced about twenty albums, it has never aroused the enthusiasm of the public usually fond of comics, nevertheless his work is often acclaimed by the critic and by artists who quote him as a reference.

For Willem, Masse was in 1982 the greatest. Thierry Groensteen evokes in 1984 the "massolatry" reigning within the team of the Cahiers de la Bande Dessinée.

Yves Frémion concludes his short biography of Masse by saying he is a major artist, alive, funny, who has something to say.

It is written in La lettre des Sables d'Olonne that Masse is unique, his universe is dark and fantastic, the author points out that Masse is the first, and still the only one, having dealt with scientific problems in the comic strip with seriousness and fantasy, he describes the style as intelligent popularization, and it is a rather entertaining and rather underestimated genre, while explaining that his writing is close to Raymond Queneau or Marcel Aymé: One must read him as an author.

Benoît Gilles says that Masse is recognized as one of the precursors of the new freedoms of the comic strip.

In 2007, the museum of Sainte-Croix Abbey in Sables d'Olonne organizes a retrospective of Masse's comics and animated films as well as an exhibition of his sculptures. The Association reissues On m'appelle l'Avalanche. Le Seuil publishes L'Art Attentat, a collection of old strips colorized by Pakito Bolino. The Dernier Cri publishes Tsunami au musée a snakes and ladders limited edition game. From February to April 2009, he appeared with Stéphane Blanquet, Gilbert Shelton, Joost Swarte and Chris Ware in the exhibition Quintet at the Contemporary Art Museum in Lyon. Since 2011, he begins to reissue his albums as well as original works at Glénat. At the end of 2014, a new Encyclopédie de Masse is reissued, with more than fifty entirely new strips, humor drawings and never-reissued strips, the artist redrawn many strips and rewrote the dialogs.

Filmography 
 14 juillet, 1971. Realised in pixilation.
 Le Cagouince Migrateur, 1971.
 Le Jugement Dernier, 1972.
 Évasion Expresse, 1973. Broadcast at the show Pop2 of ORTF on Saturday 3 November 1973 (available on web site INA).
 Le Clap, 1973. Originally made for a film based on exquisite corpse principle and realized by a collective of authors.
 La première ascension du Mont Blanc par un Français, 1974. Rushes of 20 minutes exist for this film produced by Cinémation and broadcast in the 1970s in a Michel Lancelot's show.
 Chimère, 1986. A 4 minutes short film.
 La Loi du chaos, 2002. Original script (graphical and show bible) for 26 episodes created by Masse for an animated TV show.

Publications 
List extracted from the detailed bibliography.

Magazines 
 , 1973–1974.
 , Le POP, 1973–1974.
 , Novapress, 1973–1974.
 , Glénat, 1973–1974.
 , Le bourricot magique, circa 1975.
 , Newlife Éditions, circa 1975.
 , Glénat, 1974–1976.
  , 1978.
 , AUDIE, 1975–1978, 2017–2018.
 , Les Humanoïdes Associés, 1975–1977, 1980–1987.
 , Françoise Mouly & Art Spiegelman, 1982–1985.
 , Dutch edition of Métal hurlant, 1982–1983. 
 , Sinsemilla Éditions, 1984.
 , Les Humanoïdes Associés, 1984.
 , Novapress, 1984.
 , Danish edition of Métal hurlant, 1984–1986.
 , Swedish edition of Métal hurlant, Tryckt hos Vaasa, circa 1984–1986.
 , SHIFT Éditions, 1985.
 , SHIFT Éditions, 1985–1986.
 , SEH (SHIFT Éditions), 1986.
 , parisian supplement to Télérama, 1983–1985.
 , Casterman, 1982–1990.
  (PARA-PENTE), ΓΙΩΡΓΟΣ ΜΠΑΖΙΝΑΣ ΒΑΛΤΕ, 1987–1988.
 , Alpha-Comic Verlag, 1987.
 , GEDIT spa, 1989.
 , Françoise Mouly & Art Spiegelman, 1991.
 , section La gazette du Midi Viticole.
 , AUDIE, Série OR #80 dated 20 September 2017, #81 dated 21 December 2017, #82 dated 21 March 2018, #85 dated 20 December 2018.
 , Dupuis, Spirou vs. Fluide Glacial, #4195 dated 9 May 2018.

Illustrations for papers 
 , Glénat, 1974.
 , circa 80.
 , circa 80.
 , circa 1985–1986.
 , #200, Hachette, 1986.
 , #13, January 2007, Bande dessinée et philosophie by Hélène Gaudy, Laurent Gerbier, Catherine Ternaux, Thierry Groensteen.

Miscellaneous 
 , October 1986 (cf. Le Lynx et Bennes dessinées).
 , advertisement for Meridien Hotels. Advertising Press Drawing Award 1982.
 , Film synopsis, circa 1985.

Albums 
"L'Écho des Savanes présente", 1976.
 , AUDIE, coll. "Fluide Glacial", 1977.
 , Les Humanoïdes Associés :
 Volume 1 : A-H, 1982.
 Volume 2 : I-Z, 1982.
 , Les Humanoïdes Associés :
 On m'appelle l'Avalanche : Volume 1, 1983.
 On m'appelle l'Avalanche : Volume 2, 1983.
 Reissue in one single volume, L'Association, 2007.
"30 x 40", 1985.
 , 1985.
 , Casterman, coll. "Studio (A Suivre)", 1985. Reissue Glénat, coll. "1000 feuilles", 2011.
 , Casterman, coll. "Studio (A Suivre)", 1987. Reissue Glénat, coll. "1000 feuilles", 2013.
 , Le Dernier Cri, 2007.
 , Le Dernier Cri, 2007.
 , Le Seuil, 2007.
 , Glénat, coll. "1000 feuilles", 2011.
 , Glénat, coll. "1000 feuilles", 2012. Reissue of Masse in "30x40" with an additional story "Les pommes".
 , "With English Subtitles", Le Chant des muses, coll. "Zorro Zébré", 2012.
 , L'Association, coll. "Espôlette", 2014.
 , Glénat, coll. "1000 feuilles", 2014.
 , Glénat, coll. "1000 feuilles", 2015.
 , Galerie Dock Sud, 2015.
 , Super Loto Éditions, coll. "Banco", 2015.
 , L'Association, coll. "Patte de mouche", 2016.

Posters 
 Cartoon: Dessins animés et Cie.
 Theatre: , Ils viennent jusque dans nos draps....
 Theatre: Compagnie de la mouche.
 Exhibition: Comic strips : Museum of Grenoble, 1977.
 Theatre: Troupe Le grand nuage de Magellan, Le printemps (D. Guénoun), Season 1984–1985, Trèfle Publicité.
 Short film: 7th Clermont-Ferrand Festival, February 1985.
 Exhibition: La science par la bande, Paris – La Villette, 13 March 1986.
 Exhibition: Les trames sombres de Masse, Sainte-Croix Abbey Museum – Sables-d'Olonne, 2007.

Collectives 
 , Glénat, 1978.
  p. 42-43, Elefanten Press, 1980.
 , Cumulus, 1980.
 , French Architects Institute, 1985, p. 88.
 , collection of drawings for garbage trucks of Lyon - 1200 copies - ordered by Saint-Pierre Museum, Carton Editions, 1986.
  p. 249-255, De Buck Editions, 1987.
 . 36 imaginary covers, Lion Editions, 1987.
 , 20 covers for Spirou and Fantasio, Lion Editions, 1987.
 , Albin Michel, 1987, p. 229.
 , Bob Callahan, Collier Books, 1991.
 , Glénat, 1992, p. 45.
 , Somogy, 2000.
 , Citée internationale de la BD, 2010.
 , Citée internationale de la BD, 2010.
 , Éditions La ville brûle, 2012, p. 339-341.
 , Éditions Fluide Glacial-Audie, Collection Album Fluide Glacial, 2018.

Original works bought by museum 
 Le coup de la panne, by Museum of Grenoble.

Exhibitions 
 Les maîtres de la bande dessinée européenne. Collective. National Library of France. Paris, 2000–2001.
 CNBDI - Cité Internationale de la Bande Dessinée et de l'Image. Angoulême, 2001.
 Les trames sombres de Masse. Personal retrospective. Museum of Modern Art of Abbaye Sainte Croix. Les Sables d’Olonne, 2007.
 La Bande Dessinée s’attaque au musée. Collective. Museum Granet. Aix en Provence, 2008.
 Quintet. Collective with Shelton, Ware, Swarte, Blanquet. Museum of Modern Art. Lyon, 2009.
 Le musée privé. Une histoire mondiale de la Bande Dessinée by Art Spiegelman. Collective. Comics Museum. Angoulême, 2012.
 Alternatives. Collective. Centre of Modern Art Georges Pompidou. Cajarc, 2013.
 Une histoire de Charlie. Personal retrospective. Comics Museum. Angoulême, 2015.
 Ils parlent par images. As a couple. Galery Dock-Sud. Sète, 2015.
 Enfin Masse !. Personal. Guest of honor of festival Formula Bula. Paris, 2015.
 Le Modèle Standard. Personal. Festival "Les Utopiales". Nantes, 2016.
 Tables et festins. Collective. Convent Sainte Cécile. Grenoble, 2017.

Documentation 
 , Glénat, 2009.
 , Reportage dessiné : Les trames sombres de Masse, 303 (Arts, recherche et création) No. 99, 4th quarter 2007.
 , "Des Récits pour les Lanternes", in 9e Art No. 5, January 2000.
 , "Francis Masse", in Larousse de la BD, Larousse, 2004, p. 530.
 , "Masse qui casse se surpasse", in 9e Art No. 5, January 2000.
 , "Ce qu'on appelle l'avalanche", in  No. 57, February–March 1984, p. 93-96.
 , "Matière et symbole", in  No. 57, February–March 1984, p. 90-92.
 , Mettre la science en culture, A.N.A.I.S. Edition.
 , "2007, année Masse", in 9e Art No. 14, January 2008.
 , Esprit sportif & paranoïa dans l'œuvre de F. Masse, in Bédésup, 1980.
 , "Polysémie et perversion du sens : le lecteur aveuglé", in  No. 57, February–March 1984, p. 86-89.
 , "La Mare aux Pirates", dans Télérama No. 3328, from 26 October 2013 to 1 November 2013.
 , Retour de Masse, avril 2007

References

1948 births
Living people
French animators
French cartoonists
French comics artists
French sculptors
French animated film directors
Graphic artists